Anders Tvegård (born August 6, 1975 in Porsgrunn) is a Norwegian journalist. He was US-correspondent for the Norwegian Broadcasting Corporation (NRK) based in Washington, D.C. from 2010–14. Tvegård previously worked at the foreign news desk and as news anchor on the same channel.

He was educated at Volda University College (1996–98), Darlington College of Technology (1995–96) and the University of Oslo. He has been working for NRK since 1998.

Tvegård has been reporting from conflict zones and disaster areas like the tsunami in Thailand (2004), the Israeli–Lebanese war (2006), the war on Gaza (2008), the last days of the civil war in Sri Lanka (2009), Afghanistan (2009) and the tsunami in Japan (2011)

References

Sourced
 US policy on Syria

External links
 Interview with Norwegian newspaper
 Anders Tvegård on PBS

1975 births
Living people
People from Porsgrunn
Norwegian journalists
NRK people
Norwegian television reporters and correspondents
Norwegian expatriates in the United States
Volda University College alumni